Kristóf Németh (born September 17, 1987 in Szombathely) is a Hungarian male hammer thrower.

Achievements

References

1987 births
Living people
Hungarian male hammer throwers
Sportspeople from Szombathely